Kill Cliff FC, officially known as Kill Cliff Fight Club (formerly known as Sanford MMA, Hard Knocks 365, and Combat Club) is a mixed martial arts gym based in Deerfield Beach, Florida. It was originally founded in 2017 by Henri Hooft and Greg Jones as Combat Club and later Hard Knocks 365 before being rebranded to Sanford MMA in 2019 after obtaining a sponsorship deal with Sanford Health. In July 2022, the gym rebranded to Kill Cliff FC.

Overview 
In 2017, Henri Hooft left the Blackzilians and alongside Greg Jones, founded the gym, Combat Club in Boynton Beach, Florida. This was later rebranded as Hard Knocks 365 after moving the gym to Fort Lauderdale, Florida in order to accommodate a bigger facility. Some of the fighters who were originally training at the Blackzilians would join the new gym.

In 2019, Hard Knocks 365 rebranded to Sanford MMA after obtaining a sponsorship deal with Sanford Health. A new training facility was opened in Deerfield Beach, Florida as part of the deal and Sanford Health also opened a supporting clinic adjacent to the team training facility.

In July 2022, the gym rebranded to Kill Cliff FC after Kill Cliff, an energy drink and CBD company acquired naming the rights to the gym.

The team includes roughly 40 fighters, 25 of whom fight within the largest three MMA promotions (UFC, Bellator and ONE), as well as former and current world champions.

Kill Cliff FC is notable for producing former UFC Welterweight Champion, Kamaru Usman. However, after being scheduled to fight Kill Cliff FC teammate Gilbert Burns at UFC 258, Usman left the gym in June 2020 to join Trevor Wittman at ONX Sports in Denver, Colorado. In 2022, Usman returned to Kill Cliff FC to prepare for his title defense against Leon Edwards at UFC 278. Usman subsequently lost his championship.

Notable people

Mixed martial artists

UFC 

 Kamaru Usman
 Michael Chandler
 Robbie Lawler
 Luke Rockhold
 Vitor Belfort
 Rashad Evans
 Gilbert Burns
 Derek Brunson
 Volkan Oezdemir
 Vicente Luque
 Michael Johnson
 Stefan Struve
André Fialho
 Takashi Sato
 Randy Costa
Shavkat Rakhmonov
Li Jingliang
Shayilan Nuerdanbieke
Ian Garry
Rafael Fiziev

Bellator 

 Anthony Johnson
Logan Storley
 Linton Vassell
 Matt Mitrione
 Ádám Borics

ONE 

 Aung La Nsang
 Martin Nguyen
 Brandon Vera

PFL 
 Marina Mokhnatkina
 Viktor Pešta

Kickboxers 
 Tyrone Spong

See also
List of Top Professional MMA Training Camps

References

External links 
 Official Website

Mixed martial arts training facilities
Deerfield Beach, Florida